Rhoptobaris scolopax is a North American species of flower weevil in the beetle family Curculionidae. Because the type specimen once was considered lost, authors erroneously applied the name to a species of Aulobaris.

References

Baridinae
Beetles described in 1832